Carneglia is a surname. Notable people with the surname include:

Charles Carneglia (born 1946), American mobster, brother of John
John Carneglia (born 1945), American mobster